is a Japanese contemporary artist. He was born in US.

Life and career 
Eugene Kangawa is a Japanese artist. He was born in 1989 in the United States. He is known for his conceptual and self-reductive paintings and installations.

His solo exhibition “EUGENE STUDIO After the rainbow” (2021–22), held at the Museum of Contemporary Art Tokyo, made him the youngest artist to hold a solo exhibition at the museum, where only a few Japanese artists including Yayoi Kusama, Takashi Murakami, Yoko Ono, and the others have held solo exhibitions in the past. The exhibition attracted a great deal of attention, with queues of more than 3,000 visitors per day waiting for up to 2 hours to see the works. He was also the first artist born during Japan's Heisei era to hold a solo exhibition at the Museum of Contemporary Art Tokyo.

His past exhibitions include de-sport: at 21st Century Museum of Contemporary Art, Kanazawa (2020), 89+ at Serpentine Gallery, London (2014), and Phantosia (Shikkoku-Noh (EN: pitchdarkness)-noh) at The National Art Center, Tokyo (2019).

In 2017, he was featured in The Age of Art × Technology (written by Daisuke Miyatsu, Kobunsha Shinsho) as one of the four leading artists in Japan, along with TeamLab and others.

Exhibitions and projects 
“TRANS-PLEX”, Kuandu Museum of Fine Arts,Taipei (2012)
“89plus Project”, Serpentine Gallery, London (2013)
"Agriculture Revolution3.0",Tsuruoka art forum,Yamagata,(2016)
"THE EUGENE Studio 1/2 Century later .",SHISEIDO GALLERY,Tokyo (2017)
"Shikkoku-Noh” (pitch darkness-Noh)", The National Art Center, Tokyo (2019)
"AOMORI EARTH 2019"Aomori Museum of Art,Aomori (2019)
"de-sport: The Deconstruction and Reconstruction of Sports through Art",21st Century Museum of Contemporary Art, Kanazawa (2020)
"EUGENE STUDIO After the rainbow",Museum of Contemporary Art Tokyo,Tokyo(2021-2022)

References

External links 
 Eugene STUDIO / EUGENE KANGAWA

Japanese contemporary artists
Living people
Year of birth missing (living people)
Place of birth missing (living people)
Artists from New York (state)